The brown ocean effect is an observed weather phenomenon involving some tropical cyclones after landfall.  Normally, hurricanes and tropical storms lose strength when they make landfall, but when the brown ocean effect is in play, tropical cyclones maintain strength or even intensify over land surfaces. While these systems are highly common in the United States and China, Australia is the most conducive environment, where such storm systems are called agukabams.

Background
One source of the brown ocean effect has been identified as the large amount of latent heat that can be released from extremely wet soils. A 2013 NASA study found that, from 1979-2008, 45 of 227 tropical storms either gained or maintained strength after making landfall. The press release stated, "The land essentially mimics the moisture-rich environment of the ocean, where the storm originated." Originally, research devoted to extratropical cyclones, storms that first derive energy from the warm ocean waters and later from the conjecture of various air masses, explained the intensification of storms after landfall. However, as research into these storms persists, Andersen and Shepherd, the two leading scientists behind the NASA study, discovered that some of these storms were not transitioning from warm-core to cold-core but were actually maintaining their warm-core dynamics, while ultimately outputting a greater measure of rainfall.

In order for the brown ocean effect to take place, three land conditions must be met: "First, the lower level of the atmosphere mimics a tropical atmosphere with minimal variation in temperature. Second, soils in the vicinity of the storms need to contain ample moisture. Finally, evaporation of the soil moisture releases latent heat, which the team found must measure at least 70 watts averaged per square meter." Storm systems impacted by the brown ocean effect gave rise to a new sub-category of tropical storm type called Tropical Cyclone Maintenance and Intensification Event or TCMI. Another study concluded that latent surface heat flux from land surfaces actually have the potential to be larger than from the ocean, albeit for brief periods only. Andersen and Shepherd are also examining the effects of climate change on TCMIs, looking into the potential intensification of these storms due to increase or decrease in the degree of wetness and dryness in areas susceptible to these systems.

Examples

In the North Indian Ocean, countless cases of brown ocean-type tropical depressions forming over the subcontinent of India have been reported. The IMD has been known to issue advisories for these systems, while the JTWC usually does not, due to the common lack of intensity and structure to these systems. The most recent example of a brown ocean-type system has been characterized in Cyclone Tauktae, as it maintained its intensity despite making a landfall.

In 1972, Hurricane Agnes formed as a tropical depression over the Yucatán Peninsula. It made landfall in Florida as a Category 1 hurricane, and quickly collapsed into a tropical depression. However, it reintensified into a tropical storm over central North Carolina.

In 1973, an African easterly wave completed tropical cyclogenesis into a tropical depression while still inland over Guinea, some hours before the system's center crossed over from the African mainland to the Atlantic ocean, where it later developed into Tropical Storm Christine.

2001's Tropical Storm Allison spent a dozen days in June meandering slowly across the Southeastern United States from Texas to the Carolinas, generating torrential rains and looking much healthier over land than it would over the ocean before landfall and after departure.

2005's Tropical Storm Arlene made landfall near Pensacola, Florida, but due to the Brown ocean effect, it remained a tropical depression and held its intensity and structure for two more days as it traversed inland, where it finally dissipated near Flint, Michigan.

Tropical Storm Erin of 2007 is an example of the effect, when the storm intensified over central Texas, eventually forming an eye over Oklahoma. Tropical Storm Erin gained even more traction as it travelled across the plains, a rare feat as most tropical storms weaken as they go farther inland. Andersen states "Until events like Erin in 2007, there was not much focus on post-landfall tropical cyclones unless they transitioned. Erin really brought attention to the inland intensification of tropical cyclones."

Tropical Storm Fay upon landfall over the Florida mainland strengthened to near hurricane strength and briefly forming an eye-like feature before weakening. The cause of this was the waterlogged terrain of South Florida specifically Lake Okeechobee and the Everglades.

Another possible case is Tropical Storm Bill of 2015, when saturated soil conditions sustained the system for a longer period of time.

In 2016, Tropical Depression Eleven made landfall in Eastern Florida. While over land, it became the first tropical cyclone to reach tropical storm strength while over Florida, where it was named Julia.

One possible case in the southern hemisphere is Tropical Cyclone Kelvin in 2018. Shortly after making landfall over Western Australia, Kelvin developed a clear eye and continued strengthening despite moving over the Great Sandy Desert, where most tropical cyclones rapidly weaken. The strengthening was assisted by the affected areas already experiencing record or near-record rainfall due to having the preceding Cyclones Hilda, Joyce and Low 11U also passing over the same area in the months leading up to Kelvin.

Tropical Storm Alberto of 2018 is another example of the brown ocean effect. The storm sustained its strength as a Tropical Depression after landfall, lasting for an additional three days after its landfall. Alberto became one of only eleven cyclones to reach Lake Huron as a tropical depression.

Another case in the southern hemisphere is Tropical Low 12U. It formed over the southern Joseph Bonaparte Gulf on January 25, 2021 and immediately moved south to land. Over Western Australia, it strengthened into a tropical depression and later, a tropical storm. However, it became disorganized after entering the Indian Ocean. And on 4 February 2021, it was weakened to an extratropical depression and dissipated within few days. 

One possible case is Tropical Storm Claudette. Claudette formed just prior to landfall on southern Louisiana on June 19, 2021 possibly from the moist soils from recent flooding. The system weakened to a tropical depression before it restrengthened back to a tropical storm inland over North Carolina on June 21, 2021.

The very powerful Hurricane Ida of 2021, which struck Louisiana, continued to maintain Category 4 winds some four hours after landfall, a further example of this effect.

See also
 Cyclolysis
Unusual areas of tropical cyclone formation

References

Tropical meteorology